Edith Ann Hamlin (June 23, 1902 – February 18, 1992) was an American landscape and portrait painter, and muralist. She is known for her social realism murals created while working with the Public Works of Art Project, Federal Art Project and the Section of Painting and Sculpture during the Great Depression era in the United States and for her decorative style paintings of the American desert.

Biography 
Born in Oakland, California, she was exposed to art by her father, Charles Hamlin, who took her on sketching trips as a small child. Hamlin won a scholarship to the California School of Fine Arts (1922–1924) and later attended the Teachers College at Columbia University from 1929 until 1932.

She maintained a studio in San Diego throughout the 1920s. In 1933, Hamlin established a studio in San Francisco, and was briefly married to artist Albert Barrows. By 1936 they divorced.

During the early 1930s, she traveled around New Mexico and Arizona. She was selected to paint murals for the Public Works of Art Project at the Coit Tower, and completed a WPA Federal Art Project mural for Mission High School in San Francisco. On the second floor of Coit Tower, she completed a mural named "Sports and Hunting in California". It currently has limited public access due to its location.  She worked with Maynard Dixon on the murals, and married him in 1937, after she divorced her first husband in 1936.

She also painted for the Department of the Interior Building in Washington, DC.

Hamlin completed another project for the WPA as she painted two large murals for the Mission High School (San Francisco).

She and Dixon moved to Tucson in 1939 and maintained a summer home in Mt. Carmel, Utah. In Tucson, she completed numerous public murals including two for the Santa Fe Railroad. After Dixon died in 1946, Hamlin had his ashes buried on a hill near their house where she also constructed a studio for herself. She married the artist Frank Knight Dale who did not live long and she returned to San Francisco in 1953, where she died in 1992.

Legacy
The Maynard and Edith Hamlin Dixon House and Studio, operated by the Thunderbird Foundation, offers guided tours by appointment of their home and studio in Mount Carmel, Utah. Their house has been on the Register of Historic Places since 2002.

Notable work

Arizona projects and murals 
 Grand Canyon Pueblo & Taos Pueblo, Painted in the Tucson Medical Center Old Administration Building for Santa Fe Railroad Chicago City Ticket Office, Oil and Canvas 1947.  Buck Weaver and Milford Zornes assisting.
 The Legend of Sun and Earth, Arizona Biltmore Hotel Dining Room; Phoenix, Arizona, Oil and Canvas, 1949.
 Christ and the Children, St. Ambrose Catholic Church; Tucson, Arizona, Ethyl Silicate, 1950.  (Over Painted)
 Fray Marcos de Niza on an Exploration Trip to Arizona, Jacome's Department Store; Tucson, Arizona, Steel-Reinforced Concrete, 1951 with Jack Maul, Ettore DeGrazia and George Hardy assisting (Jacome donated the pieces to the city, and it now hang at the Tucson Convention Center, one at the west entrance and the other outside the Leo Rich Theatre).
 Tucson in the ‘70s’ Old Pueblo Club; Tucson, Arizona, Oil and Panel, 1952.

California projects and murals 

 Mission San Francisco de Asis, (painted with Jay Risling assisting), Mission High School Library, San Francisco, California
 Civilization Through the Arts and Crafts as Taught to the Neophyte Indians, (painted with Betty Willey), Mission High School Library, San Francisco, California
 Sports and Hunting in California mural, Coit Tower, San Francisco, California 
 Overland Pioneers, Tracy Post Office, Tracy, California, (painting is now missing)
 Spaniards, Tracy Post Office, Tracy, California
 Days of the First Railroad, Tracy Post Office, Tracy, California

See also 
 Coit Tower
 Maynard Dixon, her spouse and fellow muralist
 Maynard and Edith Hamlin Dixon House and Studio

References

 Arnold, Elliott, Tucson Festival of Arts, 1951.
 Ainsworth, Edward, Widening Horizons: Painters of the Western Desert, 1952.
 Kovinick, Phil. The Women artist in the American West, 1976.
 Eric Firestone Gallery, Women Artist of the West, 2004
 DVD- Maynard Dixon Art and Spirit 2008

External links
 Oral history interview with Edith Hamlin and Dorothy Cravath, May 27, 1964 from Archives of American Art
 List of Edith Hamlin murals in California from The Living New Deal website
 The Thunderbird Foundation for the Arts in Utah, a non-profit organization furthering Maynard Dixon's legacy
 'Maynard Dixon: Art and Spirit', a feature-length documentary from 2008

1902 births
American women painters
20th-century American painters
American muralists
Artists from Tucson, Arizona
1992 deaths
Artists from Oakland, California
San Francisco Art Institute alumni
Teachers College, Columbia University alumni
Painters from California
Painters from Arizona
Section of Painting and Sculpture artists
20th-century American women artists
Women muralists
Federal Art Project artists
Public Works of Art Project artists